David Tong may refer to:

 David Tong (physicist), British physicist
 David Tong (footballer) (born 1955), English footballer